is a passenger railway station in the city of Ryūgasaki, Ibaraki, Japan operated jointly by the East Japan Railway Company (JR East)  and by the private railway operator Kantō Railway. The Kantō Railway portion of the station is named .

Lines
Ryūgasakishi Station is served by the Jōban Line, and is located 45.5 km from the official starting point of the line at Nippori Station. Located in the same place, Sanuki Station is the terminus of the Kantō Railway Ryūgasaki Line, and is 4.5 kilometers from the opposing terminus of the line, Ryūgasaki Station. Kantō Railway also provides bus services from the station. Some limited express Tokiwa services stop at Ryūgasakishi.

Layout
The JR East portion of the station (i.e. Ryūgasakishi Station) has one side platform and one island platform, connected to the elevated station building by a footbridge. The station has a Midori no Madoguchi ticket office. The Kantō Railway portion of the station (i.e. Sanuki Station) has one side platform.

Platforms

Jōban Line Ryūgasakishi Station

Ryūgasaki Line Sanuki Station

History
The station opened as Sanuki Station on August 14, 1900.  The current station building was completed in March 1985. The station was absorbed into the JR East network upon the privatization of the Japanese National Railways (JNR) on April 1, 1987.

The city of Ryūgasaki requested the name change and fully bore the cost of 410 million yen. However, the Kantō Railway chose to keep the original name of the station.

Passenger statistics
In fiscal 2019, the station was used by an average of 12,529 passengers daily (boarding passengers only). The daily average passenger figures (boarding passengers only) for the JR East station in previous years are as shown below.

Surrounding area

See also
 List of railway stations in Japan

References

External links
 JR East station information 
 Kanto Railway station information 

Railway stations in Ibaraki Prefecture
Jōban Line
Railway stations in Japan opened in 1900
Ryūgasaki, Ibaraki